Stefan Tone Marinovic is a New Zealand professional footballer who plays as a goalkeeper for the New Zealand national team.

Club career 
Marinovic attended Auckland private school, Kings College. In 2005, he won the New Zealand Nike Cup. In 2008, Marinovic was selected for the New Zealand under-19 schoolboys national team for its tour of Austria. He received trials from clubs such as Everton FC, FC Zürich and FC Schalke 04, but they all failed, and so he joined Waitakere United. He reached the national final with United, but they lost 6–0 to Canterbury.

In mid-2009, he graduated from the Wynton Rufer Soccer School of Excellence, created to help talented players earn trials overseas.

Marinovic was spotted by German club, SV Wehen Wiesbaden, in the 3. Liga at that time, and he signed a professional contract with them. He was the third choice goalkeeper during the 2010–11 season, and played with the U23 team. He made his professional debut for Wiesbaden on 27 April 2010 in an away game to league leaders Erzgebirge Aue when Marc Birkenbach was injured after 30 minutes. The game finished 2–2. When Michael Gurski was signed, he again became the third choice keeper, only being used for the U23 team.

In 2013, Marinovic left Wiesbaden and joined FC Ismaning and then 1860 Munich reserves, making one appearance at each club. In 2014, Marinovic signed with German Regionalliga club SpVgg Unterhaching, playing an important role in their promotion to the 3. Liga in his final season.

On 21 July 2017, Marinovic signed with MLS side Vancouver Whitecaps FC after impressing with the national team. He was released by Vancouver at the end of their 2018 season.

On 7 March 2019, Marinovic signed for EFL Championship side Bristol City until the end of the 2018–19 season, covering for injured goalkeepers Frank Fielding and Niki Mäenpää. He was released by Bristol City at the end of the 2018–19 season.

On 6 June 2019, Marinovic signed a two-year contract with A-League club Wellington Phoenix.

International career
In 2011, Marinovic made two appearances for the New Zealand U20 national team at the FIFA U20 World Cup in Colombia.

On 8 March 2015, Marinovic was called into the senior New Zealand national team to play a friendly against South Korea by coach Anthony Hudson. He made his debut in the match in Seoul on 31 March, playing the full 90 minutes, and has since established himself as the No.1 stopper for New Zealand. On his debut, he conceded a penalty kick, but saved it, eventually conceding the only goal of the game by Lee Jae-sung in the 86th minute.

Career statistics

Honours
SpVgg Unterhaching
Regionalliga Bayern: 2016–17

New Zealand U20
OFC U-20 Championship: 2011 OFC U-20 Championship

New Zealand
OFC Nations Cup: 2016

Individual
OFC Nations Cup Golden Glove: 2016
IFFHS OFC Men's Team of the Decade 2011–2020
IFFHS Oceania Men's Team of All Time: 2021

References

External links

1991 births
Living people
New Zealand people of Croatian descent
New Zealand association footballers
Association footballers from Auckland
Association football goalkeepers
SpVgg Unterhaching players
SV Wehen Wiesbaden players
TSV 1860 Munich II players
Vancouver Whitecaps FC players
Bristol City F.C. players
Wellington Phoenix FC players
Hapoel Nof HaGalil F.C. players
Hapoel Tel Aviv F.C. players
Regionalliga players
3. Liga players
Major League Soccer players
English Football League players
A-League Men players
Israeli Premier League players
2016 OFC Nations Cup players
2017 FIFA Confederations Cup players
New Zealand international footballers
New Zealand expatriate association footballers
New Zealand expatriate sportspeople in Germany
Expatriate footballers in Germany
New Zealand expatriate sportspeople in Canada
Expatriate soccer players in Canada
New Zealand expatriate sportspeople in England
Expatriate footballers in England
New Zealand expatriate sportspeople in Israel
Expatriate footballers in Israel
New Zealand under-20 international footballers